The scissors is an aerial dogfighting maneuver commonly used by military fighter pilots. It is primarily a defensive maneuver, used by an aircraft that is under attack. It consists of a series of short turns towards the attacking aircraft, slowing with each turn, in the hopes of forcing the attacker to overshoot. Performed properly, it can cause the attacking aircraft to move far enough in front to allow the defender to turn the tables and attack.

The scissors is a close-maneuvering technique, and as such, is really only useful when defending against guns or low-performance missiles. It was a major technique from World War I to the Korean War, but is much less common today. The introduction of high-angle missiles makes it much less effective, as the attacker can shoot even when the defender is not in front of them. Modern aircraft also make it difficult to use this technique as they maintain energy much better than earlier designs and the maneuvering limits are often the pilot's physical limitations, not the aircraft.

In fact, for many years now, fighter pilots flying aircraft with even a reasonable thrust-to-weight ratio and average wing loading are well-advised to avoid engaging in a scissors maneuver, since any turning, rolling, or slow-speed disadvantage the pilot's aircraft might have with respect to that of their opponent (or pilot skill in energy assessment and management techniques) will quickly become evident in the scissors, and lead to their defeat in short order.

Types 

Basic fighter maneuvering theory recognizes two different types of scissors maneuvers; the flat scissors and the rolling scissors.

Flat scissors 

A flat scissors maneuver typically results when two fighters of similar capability encounter each other at similar speeds and in the same plane of motion, and the attacking fighter has failed to press an initial positional and angular advantage into a kill, and has "overshot", or passed behind the defender. (To overshoot is to fly from an AOT (angle-off-tail: the angle between the nose of the attacker and an imaginary extended line from the nose through the tail of the defender and extending behind it into the air) of less than 90 degrees to an AOT of greater than 90 degrees.)

As such, an attacker who finds themselves in a flat scissors has transitioned from an offensive to a neutral engagement and has lost their offensive advantage. The defending pilot is often surprised initially by what was likely an unobserved attack from the rear, and while they have survived a highly defensive situation that has become a somewhat neutral encounter after the overshoot, the defender must still react quickly. After the overshoot, if the defender chooses to remain engaged with a nose-to-nose turn (that is, a turn toward the attacker in the general direction of the attacker's direction of flight) to either gain the advantage or maintain the neutral situation, the flat scissors is a common result.

Once initiated by the defender, it is difficult to disengage from a flat scissors without being exposed to danger from the weapons of the other aircraft. An experienced and patient defender might be able to turn the scissors to their advantage, however. The defender possessing superior turning capability may also initiate a flat scissors offensively, although this is certainly a dangerous gambit (as it involves allowing the attacker to approach to close range from behind), but one that may be forced upon the defender by the attacker's superior engine power or speed. After becoming aware of a more or less co-planar attack from their rear hemisphere, the defender uses co-planar energy techniques (using power reduction, uncoordinated flight, flaps, slats, or speed brakes) without moving out of the initial plane of the attack.  By remaining in the same plane of the attack, the defender might be able initially to deceive the attacker about the two airplanes' rate of closure, quickly placing the attacker into a position in which a successful attack cannot be made due to close proximity, too much angle-off-tail, or both.

In any case, if both pilots' reaction to a co-planar overshoot with only a minor air-speed differential is a co-planar nose-to-nose turn, then a flat scissors will often result.

During the repeated brief nose-to-nose passes it is possible to get off what is called a "snap-shot" (a very brief high-aspect shot) at the opponent fighter. This process of 180-degree rolls and reversed turns can be repeated many times while each pilot seeks a positional advantage through energy management, and seeks to avoid a disadvantage.

In the flat scissors, the turns and maneuvering are accomplished more or less on one plane, an imaginary flat surface (thus the term "flat" scissors) that is not necessarily horizontal, although the horizontal is a common case. The flat scissors continue until either one fighter (usually the fighter with better rolling or instantaneous turning characteristics) gains an advantage (usually due to an ability to reduce speed effectively while retaining sufficient roll and turn response from their aircraft) and gets behind their opponent and successfully shoots them down (with either a snap-shot or tracking shot), or one of the pilots maneuvers successfully to disengage from the scissors, and gets to a safe distance to make an escape, or attempt a new attack.

The flat scissors, if flown to its conclusion, is usually a contest of who can fly more slowly while maintaining sufficient controlled maneuverability to get into position for a kill as quickly as possible.

Counter-maneuvers
As mentioned above, the objective of the flat scissors is to coerce an attacker with superior power or initial speed and energy to overshoot and engage in a turning fight.  For the attacker, the objective is to either avoid the scissors against a better turning opponent or to win the scissors. There are at least two ways an attacker can avoid becoming engaged in a flat scissors.

Vertical 
The vertical counter-maneuver is especially effective for an attacker who possesses an advantageous thrust-to-weight ratio or energy over the defender, but who conversely may have a worse instantaneous and/or sustained turn rate than the defender. Such an attacker who recognizes that they are about to overshoot their opponent could, upon seeing their opponent's initial turn, pull up into a vertical climb or a high yo-yo (a climbing turn in the same direction as the defender's horizontal turn). Even if the attacker has overshot their opponent, this vertical maneuver will preserve the attacker's total energy and allow the attacker at or near the top of the climb to nose down and re-establish contact with the defender's rear quarter.  The defender, having committed to a slow turn, will have little energy left as a consequence of the turn. The attacker is now in the position to dive in for another attack, or to disengage, therefore maintaining their offensive stance.  The defender, on the other hand, has depleted their energy in the initial turn, is below the attacker, and is possibly in a worse position than when the fight started. Note however that the goal of the attacker possessing an aircraft with superior power or energy, or inferior turning capabilities, is to avoid the scissors maneuver.

Horizontal 
For an attacker with a lower thrust-to-weight ratio or initial energy but who possesses a turn performance advantage, a better option upon seeing their opponent perform the initial hard turn is to simply avoid overshooting them.  This might require reducing energy/airspeed using flaps, reduced throttle settings, or other means at the attacker's disposal. Energy is valuable, and should only be depleted as necessary to avoid overshooting an opponent. The goal is for the attacker to remain in the rear quarter of their opponent by using their turning advantage to turn inside their opponent's turn and to seek a tracking shot opportunity. If the defending aircraft with inferior turning capabilities commits to engaging in a flat scissors, then their inferior turn performance will soon become apparent, and the attacker can quickly maneuver behind the defender to obtain a successful shot.

Rolling scissors 

Like the flat scissors, the rolling scissors maneuver is typically an engagement of two fighters of similar capabilities with respect to their thrust-to-weight ratios (and thus similar climbing capabilities), turning characteristics, and wing loading.  Whereas the flat scissors typically result from a failed attack resulting in a slow speed differential overshoot of the defender by the attacker, the rolling scissors usually result from a failed attack at a higher speed.

As the attacking aircraft makes its failed attack and overshoots, the defender immediately pulls up into the vertical to further aggravate the attacker's overshoot by increasing the speed of separation of the two aircraft. Both of these factors contribute to a larger overshoot, and an increased offensive potential for the defender. The defender rolls their aircraft toward the attacker (also known as putting their lift vector on the opponent; essentially keeping the opponent as apparently above them) that has overshot him, and pulls their nose toward the attacker. This move is similar to a turn reversal in the horizontal plane, and both of these moves give the defender the offensive after an overshoot.  A skilled defender at this point might be able to make a successful snap-shot with guns, or possibly a short-range missile shot, and no scissors results.

More typically what happens next in the rolling scissors is that the initial attacker, aware of their vulnerability caused by the overshoot, also rolls their aircraft, and pulls their nose toward the defender's aircraft. Due to the two components of the initial overshoot (vertical and horizontal), if the pilots keep attempting to turn their noses toward their opponent, then energy management, elements of roll and turn (as in the flat scissors; although in the rolling scissors there are no reverses of turn), as well as climbs and descents will be required to maintain maneuvering that might, if successful, result in a position from which a shot can be made.  What evolves in the rolling scissors is a maneuver that is essentially two aircraft barrel-rolling around each other. The resulting maneuver often looks like two interwoven cork-screws or a double helix. The more barrel rolls that are flown in the rolling scissors, the more nearly the rolls become horizontal only, as each pilot attempts to deplete enough forward speed to place their fighter behind the other.

By imagining the difference between the initial conditions of the flat and rolling scissors, one can see how that the addition of the vertical component of the initial overshoot turns the rolling scissor engagement into a three-dimensional rolling encounter. Unlike the flat scissors which results in a fight to roll and turn the plane quickly, reverse turn quickly, and attempt to deplete energy in order to get behind the other aircraft to set up a successful shot, the contest in the rolling scissors is still one of successfully controlling forward motion so as to maneuver behind the other aircraft (get "on their six" in fighter pilot terminology). In the rolling scissors, the successful pilot is the one who best manages their energy in the climbs and descents of the barrel rolls, as they eventually come to have a larger overall effect on the reduction of forward speed than the simpler strategies used to reduce thrust, add drag or time the rolls and turns in the flat scissors.

The rolling scissors decidedly favor an aircraft with a power advantage over an opponent, so it is of some offensive value even to this day, although it is a difficult attacking maneuver and is very unforgiving of poor technique.

To disengage from rolling scissors, the best opportunity is when the pilot is on the downward part of one of their barrel rolls, preferably behind their opponent (but obviously not quite in a position to get a shot), and then accelerate in a power dive to try to extend away to a safe distance to escape, or initiate a new attack.

Situational awareness 
Situational awareness in both of the scissors is critical, as flight paths become very predictable to an outside observer, and an unseen enemy could easily approach this mentally demanding situation and attack with near impunity.  Also, particularly in the rolling scissors (due to the vertical component of the maneuvering), awareness of the ground and other obstacles must be maintained while most of the pilots' attention is demanded by the close and hard maneuvering required of the scissors engagements.

The modern fighter pilot is well-advised to avoid the scissors engagements, as they do not favor the characteristics of many modern fighter aircraft: aircraft with medium-to-high wing loading, powerful engines (and attendant high rates of climb allowing for significant maintained vertical maneuvering capabilities), and long-range missile weapons. The scissors are also very physically and mentally taxing on the pilots involved and can lead to a dangerous loss of situational awareness due to fixation on the one other enemy aircraft involved, leading to vulnerability to other enemies that may be flying in the area unobserved, or ground threats such as surface-to-air missiles.

See also 
 Chandelle
Split S
Immelmann turn
Thach Weave
Dogfighting

References

Further reading

Combat Maneuvers (obsolete; 404)

 Shaw, Robert L. (1985). Fighter Combat:  Tactics and Maneuvering. The United States Naval Institute Press. . Shaw's book is the standard English language reference on the subject of ACM. It is used as a text-book at the "Top-Gun" naval aviator school.

Aerial maneuvers
Aerial warfare